Cécile Prunier (born 28 August 1969) is a French freestyle swimmer. She competed in three events at the 1988 Summer Olympics.

References

External links
 

1969 births
Living people
French female freestyle swimmers
Olympic swimmers of France
Swimmers at the 1988 Summer Olympics
Swimmers at the 1987 Mediterranean Games
Mediterranean Games bronze medalists for France
Swimmers from Paris
Mediterranean Games medalists in swimming